Adi Shankaracharya is a 1983 Indian film in Sanskrit language directed by G. V. Iyer.  The film depicts the life and times of 8th century Hindu philosopher, Adi Shankaracharya, who consolidated the doctrine of Advaita Vedanta (Non-dualism) in Hindu philosophy. This movie is prime example of experimental movie era of Kannada film industry. It was the first film in India to be made in Sanskrit. At the 31st National Film Awards, it won four awards, including Best Film, Best Screenplay, Best Cinematography and Best Audiography.

Cast and crew

Cast
Sarvadaman D. Banerjee as Adi Shankaracharya
Sreenivasa Prabhu as Prajnaana
T.S. Nagabharana as Mrithyu
Bharat Bhushan as Kaippilly Shivaguru Nambudiri, Adi Shankara's father
Manjunath Bhat as Padmapada
Gopal as Thotaka
V.R.K. Prasad as Hasthamalaka
M.V. Narayana Rao as Sureshwara
Gopinath Das as Govinda Bhagavathpada
L.V. Sharada Rao as Kaippilly Aryadevi Antarjanam ("Aryamba"), Adi Shankara's mother
Leela Narayana Rao as Ubhaya Bharathi
Sreepathy Ballal as Kumarila Bhatta
G. V. Iyer as Veda Vyasa
Gopi as young Shankara
Radhakrishna as baby Shankara
Raghu Iyer as young Pranjana
Vijay Bharan as young Mrithyu
G.V.Shivanand as Guru
Gopalakrishna as Nambudiri
Mallesh as Kapalika
Murgod as Chandala
Bala Subramanya as rich man
Manohar as Mama
G.S.Natraj as Vishnu
Ajay as Sathyakama
Mahesh Swamy as Boudha Guru
Purushotham as Boudha Bhikshu
Balu as Chiushka
Girish as Vidyananda
Veena Kamal as Jabali
Gayathri Balu as Amalaka Lady

Crew
Producer: National Film Development Corporation of India
Director: G. V. Iyer
Music director: Dr. M. Balamurali Krishna
Art director: P. Krishna Murthy
Background score: B. V. Karanth
Screenplay: G. V. Iyer
Dialogue: Bannanje Govindacharya
Script (Sanskrit translation): N. Ranganatha Sharma
Film adviser: T.M.P. Mahadevan
Production in charge: K. V. Sundarambai

Awards
 1983: National Film Award
 Best Film: G V Iyer
 Best Screenplay: G V Iyer
 Best Cinematography (Colour): Madhu Ambatt
Best Audiography: S.P. Ramanathan

References

External links

1983 films
1980s biographical films
1980s historical films
Indian biographical films
Films scored by M. Balamuralikrishna
Films scored by B. V. Karanth
Films about Hinduism
Films set in the 8th century
Biographical films about philosophers
Best Feature Film National Film Award winners
Films whose cinematographer won the Best Cinematography National Film Award
Sanskrit-language films
Adi Shankara
Indian historical films
Films that won the Best Audiography National Film Award
Films whose writer won the Best Original Screenplay National Film Award
Films directed by G. V. Iyer
National Film Development Corporation of India films